Vander Veer Park may refer to:

Vander Veer Park Historic District
Vander Veer Botanical Park